Karve is an Indian surname.

Notable people
Notable people with this surname include:
 Dattatreya Gopal Karve (1898–1967), Indian economist
 Dhondo Keshav Karve (1858–1962), Indian social reformer, also known as Maharishi Karve
 Krishnaji Gopal Karve (1887–1910), Indian freedom fighter
 Irawati Karve (1905–1970), Indian anthropologist
 Raghunath Dhondo Karve (1882–1953), Indian professor of mathematics

See also

Karie (name)
Karre